Grand Internal Princess Consort Yongseong (Hangul: 용성부대부인 염씨, Hanja: 龍城府大夫人 廉氏; 20 July 1793 – March 1834), or Grand Internal Princess Consort Yeongwon, of the Yongdam Yeom clan, was a member of Joseon Dynasty's royal family as the secondary consort of Grand Internal Prince Jeongye. She was also the biological mother of King Cheoljong of Joseon and received her title after her son's ascension to the throne.

Her father and grandfather were commoners without government offices. There are no records about the siblings of her grandfather or father.

Biography

Marriage
Lady Yeom was a concubine of Yi Gwang (the future Grand Internal Prince Jeongye). Her life and relationship with Yi Gwang's first wife, Grand Internal Princess Consort Wanyang, is unknown, but from King Cheoljong's Annals of the Joseon Dynasty, we know that he made no difference in serving them when he was a child. 

In 1831, Lady Yeom gave birth to a son who was named Yi Won-beom (later became Cheoljong of Joseon).

Cheoljong's reign
After his enthronement, Cheoljong granted positions for his three maternal uncles and for his mother's ancestors to the 5th generation. Her great-grandfather was appointed as Minister of Government Administration, her grandfather was appointed as Right Chanseong and her father was appointed as Chief State Councillor. According to a legend in the Ganghwa region, Cheoljong gave 3,000 pyeong of land to his poor relatives. 

During the reign of Emperor Gojong, her relatives, Yeom Ho-gwan and Yeom Jae-heung, had served in the royal court.

Death
Lady Yeom died in March 1834. Her tomb was first located in Hongeun-dong, Hanseong-bu, but in 1851 it was moved to Gyeongjwa, Dapdong-ri, Sudong-myeon, Yangju-gun, Gyeonggi-do, South Korea alongside her husband, Grand Internal Prince Jeongye, and his first wife, Grand Internal Princess Consort Wanyang.

The tomb was built by Kim Jwa-geun (김좌근), younger brother of Queen Sunwon, and the epitaph was written by Yi Ha-eung, Grand Internal Prince Heungseon (이하응 흥선대원군), who was the father of Emperor Gojong (대한민국 고종).

Family
Father: Yeom Seong-hwa (12 July 1795 - ?) (염성화)
Grandfather: Yeom Deok-seok (1754 - ?) (염덕석) 
Great-grandfather: Yeom Sang-im (염상임)
Great-great-grandfather: Yeom Han-su (염한수)
Great-great-grandmother: Lady Kim of the Gwangsan Kim clan (광산 김씨)
Great-grandmother: Lady Yi of the Jeonju Yi clan (전주 이씨)
Grandmother: Lady Kim of the Gimhae Kim clan (김해 김씨)
Mother: Lady Ji of the Sangju Ji clan (25 October 1791 - 20 July ?) (상주 지씨)
Grandfather: Ji U-yeong (지우영)
Siblings:
Older brother: Yeom Bo-gil (염보길)
Sister-in-law: Lady Kim of the Gwangsan Kim clan (광산 김씨)
Nephew: Yeom Ho-gwan (1867 - ?) (염호관)
Niece-in-law: Lady Kim of the Gwangsan Kim clan (1863 - ?) (광산 김씨)
Grandnephew: Yeom Seok-yeong (9 February 1886 - ?) (염석영)
Unnamed older brother 
Older sister: Lady Yeom (염씨)
Brother-in-law: Kim Gyeong-yeong (김경영) of the Cheonan Kim clan
Husband:
Grand Internal Prince Jeongye (21 March 1785 - 2 November 1841) (전계대원군)
Father-in-law: Yi In, Prince Euneon (29 May 1754 – 30 June 1801) (이인 은언군)
Mother-in-law: Princess Consort Jeonsan of the Jeonju Yi clan (19 December 1764 – 4 June 1819) (전산군부인 전주 이씨)
Issue:
 Son: Cheoljong of Joseon (25 July 1831 - 16 January 1864) (조선 철종)
Daughter-in-law: Queen Cheorin of the Andong Kim clan (27 April 1837 - 12 June 1878) (철인왕후 안동 김씨)
Grandson: Prince Royal Yi Yung-jun (22 November 1858 - 25 May 1859) (원자 이융준)

See also
Grand Internal Prince Jeongye
Grand Internal Princess Wanyang
Cheoljong of Joseon
Queen Cheorin

Notes

References

Joseon people
1793 births
1834 deaths
18th-century Korean women